Avibacterium endocarditidis  is a bacterium from the genus of Avibacterium which has been isolated from a chicken with valvular endocarditis in Denmark.

References

Further reading

External links
Type strain of Avibacterium endocarditidis at BacDive -  the Bacterial Diversity Metadatabase	

Pasteurellales
Bacteria described in 2007